John David Macbride (28 June 1778 – 24 January 1868) was an academic at the University of Oxford in the 19th century.

Life and career
John David Macbride, the son of John MacBride (a naval officer and politician), was born in Plympton St Maurice, Devon, on 28 June 1778.  He studied at Cheam School and Exeter College, Oxford, becoming a fellow of the college in 1800.  He married in 1805, giving up his fellowship, and began to study law; he obtained his Bachelor of Civil Law and Doctor of Civil Law degrees in 1811.  In 1813, he was appointed to two university positions that he was to hold until his death in 1868: Lord Almoner's Reader in Arabic (reflecting his interest in oriental studies) and Principal of Magdalen Hall, Oxford.  (Both positions had previously been held by Henry Ford.) As principal, he oversaw the move from alongside Magdalen College to a new site formerly occupied by Hertford College, which had become defunct.  The move was completed in 1822, Magdalen Hall flourished under Macbride, and it became a college of the university (as the reborn Hertford College) in 1874.  His writings included The Mohammedan Religion Explained (1857) and theological lectures.  He died in Oxford on 24 January 1868.

References

1778 births
1868 deaths
Alumni of Exeter College, Oxford
Fellows of Exeter College, Oxford
Principals of Magdalen Hall, Oxford
Lord Almoner's Professors of Arabic (University of Oxford)
English orientalists
People educated at Cheam School
English male non-fiction writers